Guymon Municipal Airport  is in Texas County, Oklahoma, two miles west of Guymon, which owns it. The FAA's National Plan of Integrated Airport Systems for 2021-2025 classifies it as a general aviation airport.

From about 1957 until 1968 Central Airlines and successor Frontier Airlines stopped here.

Facilities
It has two runways: 18/36 is 5,900 by 100 feet (1,798 x 30 m) asphalt and 6/24 is 1,795 by 200 feet (547 x 61 m) turf.

The airport averaged 53 operations per day for the 12-month period ending November 29, 2019, with 52% local general aviation, 42% transient general aviation, 6% air taxi, and less than 1% military.  31 aircraft were then based at the airport: 25 single-engine and 6 multi-engine.

The airport sees scheduled cargo Cessna Caravans from Martinaire operating as a UPS feeder carrier.

References

External links 
 Aerial photo as of 10 February 1995 from USGS The National Map via MSR Maps
 

Airports in Oklahoma
Buildings and structures in Texas County, Oklahoma